Paul Facoory (born 3 August 1951) is a New Zealand former cricketer. He played 28 first-class and 8 List A matches for Otago between 1974 and 1985.

Facoory was born at Dunedin in 1951 and educated at King's High School in the city. He worked as a managing director.

References

External links
 

1951 births
Living people
New Zealand cricketers
Otago cricketers
Cricketers from Dunedin